Berkay Özcan (born 15 February 1998) is a Turkish professional footballer who plays as an attacking midfielder for İstanbul Başakşehir.

Club career

VfB Stuttgart
On 6 November 2015, Özcan extended his contract with VfB Stuttgart until June 2019. He made his debut for the first team of VfB Stuttgart on 8 August 2016 against FC St. Pauli. He finished the 2016–17 season with three goals in 23 appearances. On 3 December 2017 Özcan signed a new four-year-contract, keeping him at VfB Stuttgart until June 2021. He finished the 2017–18 season with a goal in 20 appearances.

Hamburger SV
On 25 January 2019, Özcan joined Hamburger SV on a four-and-half-year-deal.

Loan to İstanbul Başakşehir

On September 2, 2019, İstanbul Başakşehir confirmed, that they had signed Özcan on a season-long loan deal.  On July 3, 2020 the loan became permanent and Özcan signed permanently for the club.

International career
Özcan was born in Germany to Turkish parents. He is a youth international for Germany, and Turkey.

He made his debut for the Turkish senior team on 1 June 2018 against Tunisia.

Career statistics

Honours
İstanbul Başakşehir
Süper Lig: 2019–20

References

External links 
 tff.org profile
 DFB.de profile
 Berkay Özcan at Hamburger SV's website
 

1998 births
Living people
Citizens of Turkey through descent
Turkish footballers
Turkey youth international footballers
Turkey under-21 international footballers
Turkey international footballers
German footballers
Germany youth international footballers
German people of Turkish descent
Association football midfielders
VfB Stuttgart players
VfB Stuttgart II players
Hamburger SV players
İstanbul Başakşehir F.K. players
Bundesliga players
2. Bundesliga players
Regionalliga players
Süper Lig players
Footballers from Karlsruhe